Out of the Woodwork is a collaboration album by American guitarist Tony Rice, his brother, mandolinist Larry Rice, guitar and banjo player Herb Pedersen and guitar/bass player Chris Hillman.

Critical reception
Entertainment Weekly wrote that "instead of showing off their hot licks [Rice, Rice, Hillman & Pedersen] opt for tight vocal harmonies and canny song choices like a country waltz version of Aretha’s 'Do Right Woman' and a breathtaking pass at Richard Thompson’s 'Dimming of the Day.'" MusicHound Folk: The Essential Album Guide called Out of the Woodwork "a marvelously crafted album."

Track listing
 Hard Times 4:14
 Lord Won't You Help Me 1:55
 Somewhere on the Road Tonight 3:47
 No One Else 3:12
 Streetcorner Stranger 3:47
 So Begins the Task 2:37
 Dimming of the Day 3:10
 Just Me and You 3:32
 Do Right Woman 3:43
 Change Coming Down 2:29
 Story of Love 2:26
 Only Passing Through 3:54

Personnel
Tony Rice – guitar
 Larry Rice – mandolin, vocals
 Chris Hillman – bass, guitar, vocals
 Herb Pedersen – banjo, guitar, vocals

with
 Jerry Douglas – Dobro
 Mike Auldridge – Dobro
 Ronnie Simpkins – bass
 Rickie Simpkins – violin

References

1996 albums
Tony Rice albums
Rounder Records albums